The Panay striped babbler (Zosterornis latistriatus) is a species of bird in the family Zosteropidae and one of the most attractive birds in the country. It is endemic to the Philippines only being found on the island of Panay (Philippines). Its natural habitat is tropical moist montane forest. It is threatened by habitat loss.

Description 
EBird describes the bird as "A fairly small bird of mid-elevation montane forest on Panay. Dark brown above and heavily streaked with black below, with base color blending from white on the throat to buffy on the lower belly. Note the white face edged with black and the thin black stripe behind the eye. Often found in mixed-species flocks. Somewhat similar to Stripe-sided and Visayan Rhabdornises, but smaller, and lacks the broad black band through the eye. Voice includes a loud staccato trill."

Habitat and Conservation Status 
This species is known from montane mossy forest from 1,100 m to 1,900 m with most records being above 1,400 m. It prefers the middle and upper strata of the forest.

IUCN has assessed this bird as least concern. This species' main threat is habitat loss with wholesale clearance of forest habitats as a result of logging, agricultural conversion and mining activities occurring within the range.

References

Collar, N. J. & Robson, C. 2007. Family Timaliidae (Babblers)  pp. 70 – 291 in; del Hoyo, J., Elliott, A. & Christie, D.A. eds. Handbook of the Birds of the World, Vol. 12. Picathartes to Tits and Chickadees. Lynx Edicions, Barcelona.

Panay striped babbler
Birds of Panay
Panay striped babbler
Panay striped babbler
Taxonomy articles created by Polbot